Clara Ruth Cook  [״Babe״] (June 19, 1921 – July 23, 1996) was a pitcher who played from  through  in the All-American Girls Professional Baseball League.

A fastpitch left hander, Clara Cook was one of the sixty founding members of the All-American Girls Professional Baseball League for its inaugural season in 1943. Cook spent two seasons in the AAGPBL with three different teams, including the championship team in 1944.

Born in Pine City, New York, Clara was the youngest of eleven children into the family of John H. and Clara B. Cook. This is why she was called "Babe" most of the time. She spent her schooling days at Pine City School, but after school she accustomed to play baseball with her brothers. She later moved with her family to Elmira, New York.

In the early thirties, a Remington Rand employee named Riley saw Clara while playing sandlot ball with her brothers and some friends. He found out who she was and went to her home and asked her parents if she could play on the Rand baseball team. At first, her parents asked her if she would like to play baseball for an organized team, and she replied affirmatively. Clara was excited, as she had a great love for playing ball, and only being 13 years old, she knew this was a great opportunity. Then her parents gave her full permission to play ball, and Mr. Riley accordingly brought her to and from the games.

After graduating from Southside High School, Cook went to work at the Remington Rand plant, where she also helped organize friends to play ball for the company. She was spotted by an AAGPBL scout in one of those friendly matches. He invited her to join the new league, and after a tryout, she signed her official contract to play in the inaugural season of the league.

Cook entered the league in 1943 with the Rockford Peaches, playing for them in part of the season before joining the Kenosha Comets. But she did not have much success on the pitching mound. She posted a composite record of 6–17 in 30 games,  allowing more runs (177, 100 earned) than any other pitcher to finish with a 4.42 ERA. A hard worker, she pitched 203 innings for the ninth-best mark in the league.

Cook opened 1944 with Kenosha, but was traded to the Milwaukee Chicks during the midseason. That year she was converted into a reliever and pitched better, going 2–2 with a 3.40 ERA in 45 innings of work. She was ready to help the Chicks in the playoffs. Milwaukee defeated the Kenosha Comets in the best-of-seven series, and it took all seven games for the Chicks to be declared the champion team. Cook gave up an unearned run over one inning and did not have a decision.

At the end of the season, Cook returned to Elmira and to Remington Rand. She worked in there until 1955, when Sperry Corporation acquired the Elmira's plant and renamed itself Sperry Rand. She then moved to California and worked at an aircraft company until she retired.

After returning home, Cook continued to encourage and organize teams in Elmira. She also helped by coaching young women interested in pitching.

In 1975, Cook  was  inducted into the Metro-Elmira Sports Hall of Fame. She is also part of Women in Baseball, a permanent display based at the Baseball Hall of Fame and Museum in Cooperstown, New York, which was unveiled in 1988 to honor the entire All-American Girls Professional Baseball League.

Clara Cook died in Elmira, New York, at the age of 75. She was buried in the Webb Mills Cemetery, along with her parents.

Career statistics
Pitching

Batting

Fielding

References

All-American Girls Professional Baseball League players
Rockford Peaches players
Kenosha Comets players
Grand Rapids Chicks players
Baseball players from New York (state)
1921 births
1996 deaths
Sportspeople from Elmira, New York
People from Chemung County, New York
20th-century American women
20th-century American people